Leibert Cirque is a cirque between Mount Electra and Mount Dido on the south side of the Olympus Range, in the McMurdo Dry Valleys of Antarctica. The cirque opens south to the Labyrinth. It was named by the Advisory Committee on Antarctic Names (2004) after Gregg Leibert, a PHI helicopter pilot with the United States Antarctic Program in seven consecutive field seasons from 1996–97 onwards.

References

Cirques of Antarctica
Landforms of Victoria Land
McMurdo Dry Valleys